Federico Burguez (born June 24, 1994) is a Uruguayan footballer playing with Huracán Buceo in the Uruguayan Segunda División Amateur.

Playing career 
Burguez played at the youth level with CA Penarol, Boston River, and El Tanque Sisley. In 2015, he played abroad in the Canadian Soccer League with York Region Shooters B. In 2016, he played in the Uruguayan Segunda División with Canadian SC. The following season he signed with Rampla Juniors, where he featured in the reserve squad. In 2018, he signed with Huracán Buceo in the Uruguayan Segunda División Amateur.

References 

1994 births
Living people
People from Ciudad de la Costa
Association football defenders
Uruguayan footballers
York Region Shooters players
Canadian Soccer Club players
Huracán Buceo players
Canadian Soccer League (1998–present) players
Uruguayan Segunda División players